Edward Hopwood Haggis (9 June 1924 – 23 January 2017) was a Canadian sprinter, born in London, Ontario, who competed in the 1948 Summer Olympics. He is the father of Paul Haggis.

Personal life
Haggis served in the Royal Canadian Navy during the Second World War and participated in the Invasion of Normandy.

Competition record

References

1924 births
2017 deaths
Olympic track and field athletes of Canada
Athletes (track and field) at the 1948 Summer Olympics
Canadian male sprinters
Athletes from London, Ontario
Royal Canadian Navy personnel of World War II